La República is a Uruguayan newspaper, first published on 3 May 1988, and distributed nationwide. It was established by Federico Fasano Mertens. Its website is ranked 251st in Uruguay according to Alexa.

References

External links

Newspapers published in Uruguay
Spanish-language newspapers
Publications established in 1988
1988 establishments in Uruguay
Mass media in Montevideo
Spanish-language websites